Dowlatabad (also Romanized as Dowlatābād; also known as Dowlatābād-e Qadīm) is a village in Qorqori Rural District, Qorqori District, Hirmand County, Sistan and Baluchestan Province, Iran. At the 2006 census, its population was 268, in 57 families.

References 

Populated places in Hirmand County